The baya weaver (Ploceus philippinus) is a weaverbird found across the Indian Subcontinent and Southeast Asia. Flocks of these birds are found in grasslands, cultivated areas, scrub and secondary growth and they are best known for their hanging retort shaped nests woven from leaves. These nest colonies are usually found on thorny trees or palm fronds and the nests are often built near water or hanging over water where predators cannot reach easily. They are widespread and common within their range but are prone to local, seasonal movements mainly in response to rain and food availability.

Among the population variations, five subspecies are recognized. The nominate race philippinus is found through much of mainland India while burmanicus is found eastwards into Southeast Asia. The population in southwest India is darker above and referred to as subspecies travancoreensis.

Taxonomy
In 1760 the French zoologist Mathurin Jacques Brisson included a description of the baya weaver in his Ornithologie based on a specimen that he believed had been collected in Philippines. He used the French name Le gros-bec des Philippines and the Latin Coccothraustes Philippensis. Although Brisson coined Latin names, these do not conform to the binomial system and are not recognised by the International Commission on Zoological Nomenclature. When in 1766 the Swedish naturalist Carl Linnaeus updated his Systema Naturae for the twelfth edition, he added 240 species that had been previously described by Brisson. One of these was the baya weaver. Linnaeus included a brief description, coined the binomial name Loxia philippina and cited Brisson's work. It was subsequently realised that Brisson was mistaken in believing that his specimen came from the Philippines and the type locality was redesignated as Sri Lanka. This species is now placed in the genus Ploceus that was introduced by the French naturalist Georges Cuvier in 1816.

There are five subspecies:

 P. p. philippinus (Linnaeus, 1766) – Pakistan, India (except southwest and northeast), Sri Lanka and south Nepal
 P. p. travancoreensis Ali & Whistler, 1936 – southwest India
 P. p. burmanicus Ticehurst, 1932 – Bhutan, northeast India and Bangladesh through Myanmar to southwest China
 P. p. angelorum Deignan, 1956 – Thailand and south Laos
 P. p. infortunatus Hartert, 1902 – south Vietnam, Malay Peninsula, Borneo and Sumatra, Java and Bali

Description

These are sparrow-sized and in their non-breeding plumage, both males and females resemble female house sparrows. They have a stout conical bill and a short square tail. Non-breeding males and females look very similar: dark brown streaked fulvous buff above, plain (unstreaked) whitish fulvous below, eyebrow long and buff coloured, bill is horn coloured and no mask. Breeding males have a bright yellow crown, dark brown mask, blackish brown bill, upper parts are dark brown streaked with yellow, with a yellow breast and cream buff below.

Behaviour and ecology

Baya weavers are social and gregarious birds. They forage in flocks for seeds, both on the plants and on the ground. Flocks fly in close formations, often performing complicated manoeuvres. They are known to glean paddy and other grain in harvested fields, and occasionally damage ripening crops and are therefore sometimes considered as pests. They roost in reed-beds bordering waterbodies. They depend on wild grasses such as Guinea grass (Panicum maximum) as well as crops like rice for both their food (feeding on seedlings in the germination stage as well as on early stages of grain) and nesting material. They also feed on insects (including butterflies), sometimes taking small frogs, geckos and molluscs, especially to feed their young. Their seasonal movements are governed by food availability. Their calls are a continuous ... sometimes ending in a wheezy  that is produced by males in a chorus. A lower intensity call is produced in the non-breeding season.

They are occasionally known to descend to the ground and indulge in dust bathing.

In captivity, individuals are known to form stable peck orders.

Breeding
The breeding season of the baya weavers is during the monsoons. The breeding condition is initiated by environmental characters such as day length and comes to an end late in summer. This post-reproductive "photorefractoriness", in which photoperiodic  birds cease to respond reproductively to the stimulation of long days, can end spontaneously without having been exposed to short days for four to six months unlike temperate birds. They nest in colonies typically of up to 20–30, close to the source of food, nesting material and water. Baya weavers are best known for the elaborately woven nests constructed by the males. These pendulous nests are retort-shaped, with a central nesting chamber and a long vertical tube that leads to a side entrance to the chamber. The nests are woven with long strips of paddy leaves, rough grasses and long strips torn from palm fronds. A male bird is known to make up to 500 trips to complete a nest. The birds use their strong beaks to strip and collect the strands, and to weave and knot them while building their nests. The nests are often built hanging over water from palm trees and often suspended from thorny Acacias and in some cases from telephone wires. Although the birds prefer thorny trees, they sometimes use avenue trees in urban areas. Nests are often located on the eastern side of the tree, where they are believed to provide shelter from the Southwest Monsoon; however, late breeders are more likely to build their nests in other orientations relative to the trunk of the nest tree. Abandoned nests are sometimes used by mice (Mus booduga) and other birds such as munias.

Nests are built mainly in colonies but isolated nests are not unknown. Nests are often built from thorny Acacia or palm trees ( mainly Phoenix sylvestris) and hang over open water. Young males may build experimental nests among reeds. In Burma, birds often build nests under the eaves of buildings, but this habit is uncommon in India. The males take about 18 days to construct the complete nest with the intermediate "helmet stage" taking about eight days. The nests are partially built before the males begin to display to passing females by flapping their wings and calling while hanging from their nests. The females inspect the nest and signal their acceptance of a male. Once a male and a female are paired, the male goes on to complete the nest by adding the entrance tunnel. Males are almost solely in charge of nest building, though their female partners may join in giving the finishing touches, particularly on the interiors. Females may modify the interiors or add blobs of mud. A study has found that nest location is more important than nest structure for the female when it selects the nest and mate. Females prefer nests high in trees, those over dry land, and those on thin branches.

Both males and females are polygamous. Males build many partial nests and begin courting females. The male finishes the nest only after finding a mate. The female lays about two to four white eggs and incubates them for about 14 to 17 days. Males may sometimes assist in feeding the chicks. The chicks leave the nest after about 17 days. After mating with a female the male typically court other females at other partially constructed nests. Intraspecific brood parasitism is known, that is, females may lay their eggs in the nests of others. Young birds leave the nest in a juvenal plumage which is replaced in their first moult after about four to six months. The young disperse to new locations not far from their nest and young have been located up to two kilometres away from their origin. Females are capable of breeding after a year while males take half a year longer. Prior to breeding they go through a prenuptial moult. Adults also go through a second moult after breeding and thus there are two moults each year. Histochemical studies have shown increased lipid metabolism in the crown region of male Baya during the breeding season. Lipids are known to be involved in the transport of the yellow carotenoid pigments that form the crown and are subsequently metabolized.

The nest, being suspended from thorny trees and overhanging water, is protected from many predators, but nest predation by crows is not unusual. Brood may also be destroyed by lizards such as Calotes versicolor or rodents such as Vandeleuria oleracea which may take over the nest. Nests may sometimes be taken over and used for nesting by munias and Indian silverbills (Euodice malabarica).

In culture

A widespread folk belief in India is that the baya sticks fireflies with mud to the nest walls to light up the interior of the nest at night. Clay, however is known to be used in the nests of baya weavers. Males alone have been seen to add blobs of mud and dung to the nest chamber prior to pairing with a female. It has been suggested that the clay may help to stabilise the nest in strong winds.

In earlier times, the baya weaver was trained by street performers in India for entertainment. They could pick up objects at the command of their trainers. They were trained to fire toy cannons, string beads, pick up coins and other objects. According to Edward Blyth "the truth is, that the feats performed by trained Bayas are really very wonderful, and must be witnessed to be fully credited. Exhibitors carry them about, we believe, to all parts of the country; and the usual procedure is, when ladies are present, for the bird, on a sign from its master, to take a sweetmeat in its bill, and deposit it between a lady's lips, and repeat this offering to every lady present, the bird following the look and gesture of its master. A miniature cannon is then brought, which the bird loads with coarse grains of powder...." Robert Tytler noted demonstrations where the bird would twirl a thin stick with fires at the ends over its head. These uses have been noted from the time of Akbar.

Local names
Túkúra Sorai (Assamese: টোকোৰা চৰাই); baya, son-chiri (Hindi); bayya chirya (Urdu: بیّا چڑیا ); ବାୟା ଚଢ଼େଇ (Odia); sugaran (Marathi); tempua (Malay); sughari (Gujarati); বাবুই (babui) (Bengali); parsupu pita, gijigadu/gijjigadu గిజిగాడు (Telugu); gijuga ಗಿಜುಗ (Kannada); thukanam kuruvi, ആറ്റക്കുരുവി (Malayalam); thukanan-kuruvi,  தூக்கணாங்குருவி (Tamil); wadu-kurulla, tatteh-kurulla, goiyan-kurulla (Sinhala); sa-gaung-gwet, sar-buu-daung စာဗူးတောင်း (Burmese); bijra (Punjabi: ਬਿਜੜਾ ); suyam (Chota Nagpur), bagra(Maithili). संस्कृतम् (सुगृहः/चञ्चूसूचकः) Marathi (सुगरण पक्षी)

Gallery

References

Other sources
 Alexander, Horace (1972) Nest building of the Baya Weaver Bird. Newsletter for Birdwatchers . 12(9):12.
 
 
 
 Anon. (1981) Multiple Baya nests. Newsletter for Birdwatchers . 21(1):2-4.
 
 Davis, T. A. (1966) Nesting Behaviour of the Baya (Ploceus philippinus, L.). (Technical Report No. Nat 4/66.) Research and Training School, Indian Statistical Institute, Calcutta. 28 pages.
 
 
 Mathew,DN (1971) Ecology and biology of the Baya Weaver Bird Ploceus philippinus. Ph.D. Dissertation, University of Bombay, Bombay.
 Mohan, D. (1991) Common baya weaver bird - nest building habits. Newsletter for Birdwatchers . 31(9-10):2-4.
 
 Serrao, J.S. (1971) Nesting of the Baya Weaver Bird Ploceus philippinus. Newsletter for Birdwatchers . 11(10):11.
 Sharma, S.K. (1995) Nests of Baya used as filling fibre in southern Rajasthan. Newsletter for Birdwatchers . 35(3):57-58.
 
 
 Sharma, Satish Kumar (1985) A study of qualitative aspect of abnormal nesting in Baya Weaver Bird the Ploceus philippinus and P. benghalensis. J. Southern Forest Ranger's College 61:50-54.
 
 
 Sidhartha, D. (1981) Baya nests in October. Newsletter for Birdwatchers . 21(1):8.
 Singh, T. G. M. (1980) An observation on the behaviour of Indian Baya (Ploceus phillipinus) in captivity during solar eclipses. Mayura 1(2):20-21.
 Stairmand, D.A. (1971) Pre-monsoon breeding of the Baya Ploceus philippinus. Newsletter for Birdwatchers . 11(9):12.
 Thapliyal, J. P.; Tewary, P. D. (1964) Effect of light on the pituitary, gonad and plumage pigmentation in the Avadavat (Estrilda amandava) and Baya Weaver (Ploceus philippinus). Proc. Zool. Soc. London 142, 67–71.
 Vardhani, B. P.; Rao, P. S.; Srimannarayana,G. (1992) The efficacy of certain plant extracts as repellents against House Sparrow, Passer domesticus and Baya Weaver Bird Ploceus philippinus. J. Appl. Zool. Res. 3(2):193-194.
 Letitia Landon refers to the baya in 'Kishen Kower' from 'The Zenana' - "And the hues of the bayas like sunbeams combined;" She describes them in a note as 'Small crested sparrows, with bright yellow breasts'.

External links

 Baya weaver media on the Internet Bird Collection

baya weaver
Birds of South Asia
Birds of Bangladesh
Birds of Southeast Asia
baya weaver
baya weaver